Movin' Up! is an album by organist Don Patterson recorded in 1977 and released on the Muse label.

Reception
Scott Yanow of Allmusic states, "At the time that Don Patterson recorded this album (his next-to-last as a leader), organ records had become fairly rare... A fine effort that should please hard bop and soul-jazz collectors".

Track listing 
All compositions by Richie Cole except as indicated
 "Room 608" (Horace Silver) - 5:49   
 "Bossa De Leon" - 9:41   
 "Trenton Makes the World Takes" - 5:58   
 "(The World of) Susie Wong" (Sammy Cahn, Jimmy Van Heusen) - 11:18   
 "The Good Life" (Sacha Distel, Jack Reardon) - 9:12   
 "Harold's House of Jazz" - 4:30

Personnel 
Don Patterson - organ, Arp String Ensemble
Richie Cole - alto saxophone
Vic Juris - guitar
Billy James - drums

References 

Don Patterson (organist) albums
1977 albums
Muse Records albums